Aeko Kula, LLC, DBA Aloha Air Cargo, is an American air-cargo airline headquartered in Honolulu, Hawaii, operating from a hub at Daniel K. Inouye International Airport. Formerly Aloha Airlines, it became an independent cargo operator following the closure of the passenger airline in 2008.

History 

Aloha Airlines was formed in 1946 and expanded over the next few decades. It filed for Chapter 11 bankruptcy protection in the United States Bankruptcy Court for the District of Hawaii in 2004 in an attempt to cut costs and remain competitive with other airlines serving Hawaii. Following approval of new labor contracts and securing additional investment from new investors, the airline emerged from bankruptcy protection on February 17, 2006. The airline filed for Chapter 11 bankruptcy protection again on March 20, 2008. Ten days later, on March 30, 2008, Aloha Airlines announced the suspension of all scheduled passenger flights, with the final day of operation to be March 31, 2008.

After the shutdown of passenger operations, Aloha and its creditors sought to auction off its profitable cargo and contract services division. Several companies expressed interest in purchasing Aloha's cargo division, including Seattle-based Saltchuk Resources, California-based Castle & Cooke Aviation, and Hawaii-based Kahala Capital (which included Richard Ing, a minority investor in the Aloha Air Group and member of Aloha's board of directors). However, a disagreement between cargo division bidders and Aloha's primary lender, GMAC Commercial Finance, ended with the bidders dropping out of the auction. Almost immediately afterwards, GMAC halted all funding to Aloha's cargo division, forcing all cargo operations to cease; at the same time, Aloha's board of directors decided to convert its Chapter 11 bankruptcy reorganization filing into a Chapter 7 bankruptcy liquidation.

Saltchuk Resources decided to renew its bid to purchase the cargo division at the urging of U.S. Senator Daniel Inouye, and a deal between Aloha and Saltchuk was struck and approved by the federal bankruptcy court, where Saltchuk would purchase the cargo division for $10.5 million.  The sale was approved by federal Bankruptcy Judge Lloyd King on May 12, 2008, with the sale expected to close two days later.

Prior to its bid for Aloha, Saltchuk Resources was already present in Hawaii through its subsidiaries Young Brothers/Hawaiian Tug & Barge, Hawaii Fuel Network, Maui Petroleum and Minit Stop Stores. The company also owns Northern Air Cargo, Alaska's largest cargo airline.  A new subsidiary, Aeko Kula, LLC., was set up by Saltchuk to operate Aloha Air Cargo.

On May 15, 2008, the airline received its FAA and Department of Transport authority to operate as an independent airline. The airline went through a big transformation in the first two years of operation. The airline's first president, Mike Malik, rebranded the airline; launched a host of new products and services; and established "Aloha Tech Ops", the MRO division. During this time the airline won numerous awards and was named Hawaii's Cargo Airline of the year for 2008.

Destinations

United States

Hawaii 
Hilo (Hilo International Airport)
Honolulu (Daniel K. Inouye International Airport) Hub
Kahului (Kahului Airport)
Kona (Kona International Airport)
Lihue (Lihue Airport)

California 
Los Angeles (Los Angeles International Airport)

Washington
Seattle (Seattle-Tacoma International Airport)

Fleet 
The Aloha Air Cargo fleet consists of the following aircraft (as of August 2016):

The airline fleet previously included the following aircraft (as of June 2014):
 4 Boeing 737-200C (stored) former aircraft of Aloha Airlines
 1 Boeing 767-300F Leased from ABX Air
3 Saab 340AF

Incidents
October 16, 2014 - N301KH a Boeing 737-300F performing freight flight from Lanai, HI to Honolulu, HI experienced a cargo shift on take-off but the crew managed to control the aircraft and continued for a safe landing in Honolulu.  The shifting cargo damaged the rear bulkhead.  The incident was thought to have been caused by the cargo not being properly strapped to the floor.

See also
Aloha Airlines
Airlines Based in Hawaii

References

Bibliography

External links 

 

Airlines based in Hawaii
Cargo airlines of the United States
Companies based in Honolulu
Airlines established in 2008
Companies that have filed for Chapter 7 bankruptcy
Companies that filed for Chapter 11 bankruptcy in 2004
American companies established in 2008
2008 establishments in Hawaii